Sinningia canescens, called the Brazilian edelweiss, is a species of flowering plant in the genus Sinningia, native to southeastern and southern Brazil. A tuberous perennial reaching , it has gained the Royal Horticultural Society's Award of Garden Merit as a hothouse ornamental.

References

canescens
Endemic flora of Brazil
Plants described in 1975